Protoherilla is a genus of gastropods belonging to the family Clausiliidae.

The species of this genus are found in the Balkans.

Species:

Protoherilla baleiformis 
Protoherilla mirabilis 
Protoherilla pseudofallax

References

Clausiliidae